The Saga Continues... is the third studio album released by American hip hop artist P. Diddy & The Bad Boy Family on July 10, 2001, in North America. It was the first studio album released by Combs under the P. Diddy name, and last studio album under Bad Boy Entertainment's joint venture with Arista Records (his We Invented The Remix album was the last overall album with Arista).

The album debuted at number two on the Billboard 200 and topping the Top R&B/Hip-Hop Albums chart.

Track listing

Singles
 "Diddy"
 "Bad Boy for Life"
 "Let's Get It"
 "I Need a Girl (To Bella)"
 Released in the form of two remixes: Pt. 1 (featuring Usher and Loon) and Pt. 2 (featuring Mario Winans, Ginuwine and Loon). Both appeared on We Invented The Remix Vol. 1 and had a respective music video. The original version appears on certain "I Need a Girl (Pt. 1)" singles.

Charts

Weekly charts

Year-end charts

Certifications

References

Sean Combs albums
Bad Boy Records albums
Albums produced by the Neptunes
Albums produced by Buckwild
Albums produced by Sean Combs
2001 albums